Swinging on a Star  is a musical revue, featuring the music of Johnny Burke, with the lyrics by Burke and the music by Burke and several of his partners, such as Erroll Garner and Jimmy Van Heusen. The name of the revue is from the Oscar-winning song that Burke wrote with Jimmy Van Heusen for the 1944 film Going My Way.

Productions
Swinging on a Star premiered at the George Street Playhouse, New Brunswick, New Jersey, on April 16, 1994, running to May 1994. The revue was conceived, written and directed by Michael Leeds, with costumes by Judy Dearing, sets by Deborah Jasien and choreography by Kathleen Marshall. The cast featured Michael McGrath, Alton Fitzgerald White, Kathy Fitzgerald and Lewis Cleale.

The revue was next produced at the Goodspeed Opera House, Connecticut in 1995.

The show opened on Broadway at the Music Box Theatre on October 22, 1995 and closed on January 13, 1996 after 96 performances and 19 previews. Directed by Michael Leeds and choreographed by Kathleen Marshall, it featured Michael McGrath, Teresa Burrell, Lewis Cleale, Denise Faye, Eugene Fleming, Kathy Fitzgerald, and Alvaleta Guess.

Synopsis and songs
Each segment showed a different time and place. 

Act I 
Speakeasy-Chicago (1920s)
You're Not the Only Oyster in the Stew
Chicago Style
Ain't It a Shame About Mame
What's New?
Doctor Rhythm

Depression-The Bowery
Pennies from Heaven
When Stanislaus Got Married
His Rocking Horse Ran Away
Annie Doesn't Live Here Anymore

Radio Show- New York City (1940s)
Annie Doesn't Live Here Anymore
Scatterbrain
One, Two, Button Your Shoe
What Does It Take to Make You Take to Me?
Irresistible
An Apple for the Teacher
 
USO Show-The Pacific Islands
Thank Your Lucky Stars and Stripes
Personality
There's Always the Blues
Polka Dots and Moonbeams
Swinging on a Star
Stars and Stripes

Act II
Ballroom
Don't Let That Moon Get Away
All You Want to Do Is Dance
You Danced with Dynamite
Imagination
It Could Happen to You

Road To...
Road To Morocco
Apalachicola, FLA
You Don't Have to Know the Language
Going My Way
Shadows on the Swanee
Pakistan
Road to Morocco (Reprise)

Supper Club (1950s)
But Beautiful
Like Someone in Love
Moonlight Becomes You
If Love Ain't There (It Ain't There)
Sunday, Monday, or Always
Misty
Here's That Rainy Day
Pennies from Heaven (Reprise)
Swinging on a Star (Reprise)

Sources "Swinging on a Star: The Johnny Burke Musical" (1996),  Johnny Burke, Joe Bushkin, Michael Leeds, pp. 4 and 7, ; Guide to Musical Theatre; IBDB.com

Awards and nominations

Original Broadway production

References

External links
Internet Broadway Database listing

1995 musicals
Broadway musicals
Revues